Bend is the second and final album by the band The Origin, released in 1992. The lead single, "Bonfires Burning", charted at number 17 on the Billboard Modern Rock Tracks chart.

Release and reception 
Bend was released on CD and cassette on February 11, 1992, with eleven tracks featuring a more mature sound with elements of psychedelia, folk, rock, and power pop. Upon release, Bend did not chart on the Billboard 200, receiving little attention during the changing era of grunge at the time. Two of the album's tracks were released as singles, with one charting on the Billboard Modern Rock Tracks. The album is currently out of print and unavailable on digital stores and streaming sites.

Allmusic gave the album an editor rating of 4.5 out of 5 stars, with Stanton Swihart describing it as "elastic, funky, vaguely spacey, rhythm heavy, soulful. The songs were significantly stronger both melodically and thematically and the playing much more dynamic than their self-titled debut. The quartet sounds less reigned in, and, as a result, they were able to let the songs find their own forms and create a considerably more organic and rootsy vibe." Swihart continues... "the most impressive songs position themselves in a long Golden State lineage, from the Neil Young echoes of "Giving It All" to the gloomy, epic folk-rock of "Candymine" and the glimmering, sun-over-the-horizon feel of "Never Again." And the title track has a subdued beauty that seems to take an orchestral grandeur from the California landscape."

Track listing
All songs written by The Origin except * written by Michael Andrews. All words by Michael Andrews.

Personnel

Musicians
 Michael Andrews – lead vocals, acoustic, electric and lap steel guitars, words, harmonica
 Topper Rimel – bass, background vocals
 Daniel Silverman – piano, organ, background vocals
 Rony Abada – drums

Production
 Produced by Jeffrey Wood
 Recorded at Brilliant Studio, San Francisco
 Engineer: Andy Taub
 Assistant Engineers: Chris Haley
 Additional Recording at Studio II, Culver City
 Engineers: Jason Wolchin, Richard Kaplan, Chris Kupper
 Assistant Engineer: Jordan Jannone
Mixed at Ground Control, Santa Monica
 Engineer: Mark Ettel
 Assistant Engineer: Ken Koroshetz
 Mastered by Brian Gardner at Bernie Grundman Mastering
 A&R Direction: Andy Factor
 Guitar Tech: Jay Moxley
 Art Direction and Photography: Melanie Nissen
 Design: Inge Schaap
 Cover Art: Jeremy Farson

Singles

Music videos

References

External links
 
 

1992 albums
The Origin (band) albums